The Tuck Lung Building is a historic building in Portland, Oregon's Old Town Chinatown neighborhood, in the United States.

References

External links

 

Buildings and structures in Portland, Oregon
Northwest Portland, Oregon
Old Town Chinatown